Lymantria ninayi is a species of moth of the family Erebidae. It is found in Papua New Guinea.

It is a pest insect and can cause major damage to forests. In particular, Pinus species, which are introduced in Papua New Guinea, can be completely defoliated by the larvae. Plantations on New Guinea suffer from outbreaks once every seven to nine years.

The native food plants of the larvae are Casuarina species. The larvae feed on the needles. Young larvae feed on young needles, while older larvae feed on older needles. They only consume a small portion of a needle, the rest drops to the ground. Pupation takes place in the needles on the tree or on the ground in a cocoon made of tied up needles.

External links
Species info

Lymantria
Moths described in 1910